World Pool Championship may refer to:

Active events
 WPA World Nine-ball Championship, first contested in 1990
 WPA Women's World Nine-ball Championship, from 1990
 WPA World Eight-ball Championship, first contested in 2004 
 WPA World Blackball Championship, first contested in 2006 
 WPA World Ten-ball Championship, first contested in 2008

Dormant events
 World Straight Pool Championship, last contested in 2010
 World Team Championship (pool), last contested in 2014
 WPA World Artistic Pool Championship, last contested in 2019
 WPA World Pyramid Pool Championship, last contested in 2019

See also
World Pool-Billiard Association
Matchroom Sport
World Cup of Pool
World Pool Masters